Stigmacoccus is a genus of scales and mealybugs in the family Stigmacoccidae. There are at least three described species in Stigmacoccus.

Species
These three species belong to the genus Stigmacoccus:
 Stigmacoccus asper Hempel, 1900 (found in Brazil)
 Stigmacoccus garmilleri Foldi, 1995 (found in Mexico)
 Stigmacoccus paranaensis Foldi (found in Brazil)

References

Scale insects